The Quail Hunt is a 1935 short theatrical cartoon by Universal Pictures starring Oswald the Lucky Rabbit. It is the 106th Oswald cartoon by Walter Lantz Productions and the 157th in the entire series. This is the one of the last two shorts to feature Oswald in his 1920s style, the last official appearance of his 1920s style was Monkey Wrenches.

Plot
Oswald and his dog Elmer the Great Dane are in the woods hunting for birds, especially quails. Though equipped with a boomstick, Oswald finds it difficult to take down a single quail as the fowls are quite clever. He even has problems trying not to get pushed back each time he fires his gun.

Heading further in the forest, Elmer chases a little quail. The dog follows until he naively runs past a cliff. Instead of letting the hound plummet into the ground, however, the little quail moves and breaks Elmer's fall. Elmer is most thankful and therefore befriends the small bird.

While things are going well for Elmer and the little quail, a hawk appears before them and sets sights on the tiny bird. As the hawk goes for a strike, Elmer struggles to defend his little friend. Eventually, the hawk and the dog collide into each other, resulting the buzzard being naked and Elmer covered in feathers.

Oswald finally shows up at the scene. Thinking the dog is a turkey due to the latter's feathery exterior, Oswald fires his gun at Elmer, blowing the feathers off. He then notices the little quail, and therefore begins shooting at it too. Elmer immediately intervenes and tells him the small bird is now friends with them. Elmer then embraces Oswald and the little quail in both arms.

See also
Oswald the Lucky Rabbit filmography

References

External links
 The Quail Hunt at the Big Cartoon Database

1935 films
1935 animated films
1930s American animated films
1930s animated short films
American black-and-white films
Films directed by Walter Lantz
Films about hunters
Oswald the Lucky Rabbit cartoons
Universal Pictures short films
Walter Lantz Productions shorts
Universal Pictures animated short films
Films directed by Tex Avery
Animated films about dogs